Chlorophytum borivilianum is a herb  with lanceolate leaves, from tropical wet forests in peninsular India. The Hindi name is safed musli (also commonly known as musli).

It is cultivated and eaten as a leaf vegetable in some parts of India, and its roots are used as a health tonic under the name safed musli. In traditional Indian medicine it is used as rasayan or adaptogen. It is considered a white gold in Indian systems of medicine. This herb belongs to the vajikaran rasayana group in Ayurveda.

References
।राजस्थान की दुर्लभ  पादप प्रजाति हैं

 Safed Moosli (Chlorophytum borivilianum L.): Medicinal and Wonder Crop
 Safed Musli (Chlorophytum species) - A Wonder Drug in the Tropical Zone
  Safed musli (Chlorophytum borivilianum): a review of its botany, ethnopharmacology and phytochemistry 
 

Agavoideae